Frank Murphy (14 March 1900 – 28 May 1953) was an Australian rules footballer who played with Carlton and Hawthorn in the Victorian Football League (VFL).

Family
The son of Michael Andrew Murphy and Esther Frances Murphy, nee Elliott, Francis James Murphy was born at Paddington in Sydney on 14 March 1900.

Football
Recruited from Carlton District, Frank Murphy played a single senior game for Carlton in Round 18 of the 1921 VFL season.

Murphy moved to Hawthorn (then in the Victorian Football Association) in the middle of the 1922 season. He played 24 games for Hawthorn before moving to Rosedale in June 1924 and electing to play for the local team.

In 1926, with Hawthorn now playing in the Victorian Football League, Murphy expressed his wish to return to the club. His return was delayed until he could buy out the remainder of his contract with Rosedale. With the payment made, Murphy played a further 28 senior games for Hawthorn, finishing his senior career in 1928.

Notes

External links 

Frank Murphy's playing statistics from The VFA Project
Frank Murphy's profile at Blueseum

1900 births
Australian rules footballers from Victoria (Australia)
Carlton Football Club players
Hawthorn Football Club (VFA) players
Hawthorn Football Club players
1953 deaths